Eselealofa 'Ese' Apinelu is a Tuvaluan lawyer and sports official. Apinelu attended The Cathedral School, Townsville, Queensland, Australia. She graduated with a Bachelor of Arts and Bachelor of Laws from the University of Tasmania in 1998. She is Tuvalu's first female lawyer.

She was appointed as the Acting Attorney General of Tuvalu in 2006. In 2008, Apinelu became the first female appointed as the Attorney General of Tuvalu. In 2012, she became the first female Executive Member of the South Pacific Lawyers' Association (SPLA) and the Chair of the SPLA Women in the Law Committee.

She is also President of the Tuvalu Volleyball Federation, and was the manager of Tuvalu's volleyball team at the 2003 South Pacific Games. She was the President of the Tuvalu Association of Sports and National Olympic Committee (TASNOC) from 2013 to 2015.

See also

 List of first women lawyers and judges in Oceania

References

Living people
Attorneys General of Tuvalu
Tuvaluan referees and umpires
University of Tasmania alumni
Tuvaluan lawyers
21st-century women politicians
Women government ministers of Tuvalu
Women lawyers
Year of birth missing (living people)
21st-century women lawyers